Follicular cell may refer to:

 Thyroid follicular cell, found in the thyroid gland
 Granulosa cell, found in the follicles around oocytes
 Follicular dendritic cell, found in the follicles of lymphoid tissue
 Follicular B cell, found in the follicles of lymphoid tissue

See also
 Follicle (anatomy)